This is a list of mountains in the Australian Capital Territory. It includes all mountains with a gazetted name.

This list is complete with respect to the 1996 Gazetteer of Australia. Dubious names have been checked against the online 2004 data, and in all cases confirmed correct. However, if any mountains have been gazetted or deleted since 1996, this list does not reflect these changes. Strictly speaking, Australian place names are gazetted in capital letters only; the names in this list have been converted to mixed case in accordance with normal capitalisation conventions. Locations are as gazetted.

See also
List of mountains in Australia

References

 
Australian Capital Territory-related lists